Xihuayuan Subdistrict may refer to these subdistricts in China:

Xihuayuan Subdistrict, Yinchuan, in Xixia District, Yinchuan, Ningxia
Xihuayuan Subdistrict, Datong, in Yungang District, Datong, Shanxi